Taputeranga Marine Reserve is a legally protected area of sea and coast along the southern edge of Wellington, in New Zealand. It was officially opened in September 2008.

See also
 Marine reserves of New Zealand

References

External links
Taputeranga Marine Reserve at the  Department of Conservation
Brochure and map of the reserve

Marine reserves of New Zealand
Wellington City
Protected areas established in 2008
2008 establishments in New Zealand
Protected areas of the Wellington Region